Valfurva (Valforba in lombard) is a comune (municipality) in the Province of Sondrio in the Italian region Lombardy, located about  northeast of Milan and about  northeast of Sondrio, in the Alps.

The municipality of Valfurva contains the frazioni (subdivisions, mainly villages and hamlets) Uzza, San Nicolò, Sant'Antonio, San Gottardo, Madonna dei Monti, and Santa Caterina.

Valfurva borders the following municipalities: Bormio, Martell, Peio, Ponte di Legno, Sondalo, Stilfs, Valdisotto.

Demographic evolution

References

Cities and towns in Lombardy